Saheena (also spelled sahina or sahiena) are a street-food and snack of Indian origin in Trinidadian cuisine.

History and etymology 

The dish traces back to indentured labourers from India. After the end of slavery in Trinidad in 1840, the plantations (that dominated Trinidad's economy at that time) needed a cheap substitute for the slaves' labour power. It was found in contract workers from British India. From 1840 on workers were recruited in large numbers who had to commit themselves for five years minimum and were promised five acres of land as a reward. Until World War I 145.000 mainly East Indian workers migrated to Trinidad, adopting their recipes to the supply of ingredients found in their new home. According to the Dictionary of the English/Creole of Trinidad & Tobago the term saheena derives from the Bihari family of languages and means delicious or savoury. The term saheena is a collective noun and is used in singular and plural form.

Saheena are an ordinary dish and are being prepared at home as well as bought from takeaway stores and stalls. They are also served as a side dish at festive occasions such as Divali or Eid. Mobile breakfast stalls that sell doubles, the most popular breakfast in Trinidad, often also sell saheena. While many dishes of the Indo-Trinidadian cuisine are popular on other Caribbean islands Saheena remain a dish prevalent in Trinidad only.

Preparation 

Two common preparation methods for saheena exist: A more complex one (roll up) and a simple one (cut up). Both are based on the same ingredients, but since the share of the main ingredient and the preparation method differ, the preparation methods differ significantly in taste and texture. For both variants a creamy dough is prepared from grounded chickpeas or chickpea flour, flour, garlic, onions, spices and water. The most common spice for the dough is turmeric, with cumin and black pepper also being used frequently. To round out the taste, green seasoning, a popular herb mixture based on culantro, can be added.

For the more complex preparation method (roll up) dasheen leaves and dough are layered by spreading dough onto the upper side of the current leaf. The stacked leaves are rolled up like roulades, fixated, and then either steamed or cooked in a waterproof bag. The rolls are then cut into slices, which are turned in spiced flour and dough and finally baked through. The dough for frying needs to be more chewy than the dough mixed with the leaves. The roll-up method is mostly used for formal celebrations outdoors.

For the easier preparation method (cut up) dasheen leaves are cut into small pieces, mixed with dough, formed into palm-sized cakelets and fried in oil or fat. The cut-up methos is the one that's mainly found at food stalls. An even more simple preparation method for cut-up saheena is preparing a mixture of minced dasheen leaves, water and industrial pholourie dough and frying it in portions.

Saheena are served with kuchela, a chutney or other condiments. Chutneys are omnipresent in Trinidadian cuisine; the predominant flavours are mango and tamarind. In addition to condiments, chili sauces are used on saheena. A common eating method for cut-up saheena is to cut it up and coat the insides with condiments. In Trinidad, dasheen leaves are available at markets rather than in supermarkets, so they're less readily available due to limited opening times. If unavailable, it is often exchanged for spinach which tastes similar, or for collard. When touched, dasheen leaves cause an itching of the hands. To prevent this, hands are slathered with a little bit of lime juice, or the leaves are washed with a bit of lime juice.

Leftovers of the dish can be used in a dish called "saheena talkari". Slices of roll-up saheena are cooked in a curry sauce and served with the sauce.

References

External links 
 
 

Fast food
Indo-Caribbean cuisine
Trinidad and Tobago cuisine